A number of ships have been named Arcadia, including:

Merchant ships
, a passenger liner built by Harland and Wolff for P&O, in service 1888–1915
, a cargo ship built by Harland and Wolff for Hamburg America Line, in service 1897–1926
, a cargo ship in service with Hamburg America Line 1922–1934 
 (1929), a steamboat that operated in the state of Washington, United States
, a passenger liner and cruise ship of P&O, in service 1954–1979
, a cruise ship in service under that name with P&O Cruises 1997–2003
, a cruise ship of P&O cruises, in service since 2005

Naval ships
, a patrol boat possibly in commission during 1918
, a troop transport in commission from January to September 1919
, a destroyer tender in commission from 1945 to 1968

See also
 Ships named Arcadian

References

 

Ship names